The Men's 200 metre breaststroke competition of the 2020 European Aquatics Championships was held on 19 and 20 May 2021.

Records
Prior to the competition, the existing world, European and championship records were as follows.

Results

Heats
The heats were started on 19 May at 11:07.

Semifinals
The semifinals were held on 19 May at 18:54.

Semifinal 1

Semifinal 2

Final
The final was held on 20 May at 19:09.

References

External links

Men's 200 metre breaststroke